Nakhon Ratchasima is a male professional volleyball team based in Nakhon Ratchasima, Thailand.

Honours

Domestic competitions
 Thailand League :
  Champion (6): 2007–08, 2012–13, 2013–14, 2014–15, 2017–18, 2019–20, 2020–21
  Runner-up (2): 2010–11, 2015–16
  Third (1): 2009–10
 Thai-Denmark Super League :
  Champion (3): 2016, 2017, 2019
  Runner-up (1): 2014
  Third (1): 2018

International competitions
 Asian Club Championship 2 appearances 
 2015 — 9th place
 2018 — 6th place
 2021 — 4th place

League results

Current squad
As of August 2019

Head coach

Notable players 

Domestic Players

 Pisanu Harnkhomtun
 Bussarin Maholan
 Kitsada Somkane
 Arthit Wongthon
 Nattapong Kesapan
 Pariyawat Paiboon
 Krauwut Hwangphunklang
 Surapong Polsawat
 Jetsadakorn Nusee
 Pitak Ausoongnoen
 Jirawan Thumtong
 Wutthikrai Torrobrum
 Somporn Wannaprapa
 Ratchanon Chaichalasang

Foreigner Players

 Myo Min Oo (2013-2014)
 Aung Thu (2014-2018)

 Dougla Bueno (2018-2019)
 Pablo Femando (2018-2019)

 Deepthi Romash (2018-2019)
 Janita Surath (2019-2020)

 Rivan Nurmulki (2019)

 Almal Khan (2019-2020)

Volleyball clubs in Thailand